Ilya Vladimirovich Maksimov (born 2 February 1987) is a Russian former football central midfielder.

International career
On 11 March 2016, he was called up to the Russia national football team for friendly games against Lithuania and France. He made his debut for the national team on 26 March in a game against Lithuania.

Personal life
He is the older brother of footballer Ivan Maksimov.

Career statistics

Club

Notes

References

External links
 Guardian's Stats Centre
 

1987 births
Sportspeople from Nizhny Novgorod
Living people
Russian footballers
Russia youth international footballers
Russia under-21 international footballers
Russia national football B team footballers
Russia international footballers
FC Zenit Saint Petersburg players
UEFA Cup winning players
FC Shinnik Yaroslavl players
Association football midfielders
FC Khimki players
Russian Premier League players
FC Kuban Krasnodar players
FC Volga Nizhny Novgorod players
FC Nizhny Novgorod (2007) players
PFC Krylia Sovetov Samara players
FC Anzhi Makhachkala players
FC Arsenal Tula players
FC Khimik Dzerzhinsk players
FC Sportakademklub Moscow players